Astragalus panamintensis is a species of milkvetch known by the common name Panamint milkvetch.

Distribution
It is endemic to Inyo County, California, where it is native to the Panamint Range. It grows from cracks in the limestone cliffs of the desert mountains.

Description

The inflorescence holds one to four pinkish-purple flowers, each around a centimeter long. The fruit is a roughly hairy legume pod which is somewhat triangular in cross-section and dries to a papery texture.

References

External links
Jepson Manual Treatment - Astragalus panamintensis
USDA Plants Profile: Astragalus panamintensis
UC CalPhotos gallery of Astragalus panamintensis 

panamintensis
Endemic flora of California
Flora of the California desert regions
Panamint Range
Natural history of the Mojave Desert
Natural history of Inyo County, California
Death Valley National Park
Flora without expected TNC conservation status